Maxim Andreyevich Shabalin (born 25 January 1982) is a Russian former competitive ice dancer. He and partner Oksana Domnina are the 2010 Olympic bronze medalists, the 2009 World Champions, the 2008 & 2010 European Champions, the 2007 Grand Prix Final champions, and three-time (2005, 2007, 2010) Russian national champions.

Career

Early career 
Shabalin began skating aged four in Samara – although pushed into the sport by his parents, he grew to enjoy it by the age of 11. He began competing in ice dancing aged 11 or 12. At the age of 15, he moved to Bulgaria to skate with Margarita Toteva for that country but the partnership ended due to her injury. He then competed with Elena Khalyavina for Russia.

Partnership with Domnina 
Shabalin was paired with Oksana Domnina in May 2002 by coach Alexei Gorshkov. In their first season together, they won every junior level competition they entered, including the 2002–03 Junior Grand Prix Final and the 2003 World Junior Championships.

Shabalin sustained a meniscus injury in spring 2007 and had surgery on his right knee in May. They initially worked on a free dance to Schindler's List but when they wanted to add a faster section they thought it looked too much like a hodgepodge; after consultation with Tatiana Tarasova, they began working on a new free dance to Masquerade Waltz at the start of August. In September 2007, Shabalin also had surgery due to appendicitis. He then had problems with his left knee and had another operation in December. He returned to win the 2008 Europeans but limped off the ice. The pain persisted despite therapy, preventing them from training fully and resulting in their withdrawal from the 2008 World Championships. Shabalin spent five weeks in treatment in Munich, Germany, while Domnina trained on her own in Odintsovo, near Moscow.

In June 2008, Domnina/Shabalin announced they were leaving their longtime coach Alexei Gorshkov and moving from Russia to the United States to train with husband-and-wife coaches Natalia Linichuk and Gennadi Karponosov at the IceWorks Skating Complex in Aston, Pennsylvania. The move was considered surprising as their rivals Tanith Belbin / Benjamin Agosto had also moved to the same coaches a couple months prior, but Domnina said the competition at the rink was stimulating.

Domnina/Shabalin won the silver medal at the 2008-09 Grand Prix Final, and then took gold at 2009 Worlds. Afterwards, Shabalin returned to Germany for another four months of therapy on his left knee. They missed the 2009–10 Grand Prix series as a result of his knee problems. They resumed training in November 2009. Shabalin decided to use a brace in practice and competition to limit the movement and protect his knee.

Their original dance based on Australian Aboriginal folk dances sparked controversy in early 2010. Australian Aboriginal leaders were offended by the dance. Domnina/Shabalin said they meant no disrespect and would do the dance at the Olympics. When it was first skated at the 2010 Russian Championships, they wore face makeup but removed it for the 2010 European Championships. Domnina/Shabalin won the bronze medal at the 2010 Olympics and withdrew from the World Championships as a result of continued problems with his knee. He was diagnosed with osteoarthritis. Shabalin received the Overcoming Award at the 2010 Crystal Ice Awards held in October 2010 in Moscow. He was also appointed head coach of the Russian national ice dancing team.

Personal life 
Shabalin was born on 25 January 1982 in Samara, Russia. He studied civil administration. He married Russian actress Irina Grineva in November 2010. Their daughter, Vasilisa, was born on 6 July 2013 in Marbella, Spain.

Programs

With Domnina

With Khalyavina

Competitive highlights 
GP: Grand Prix; JGP: Junior Series/Junior Grand Prix

With Domnina for Russia

With Khalyavina for Russia

With Toteva for Bulgaria

References

External links 

 
 
 

Russian male ice dancers
Bulgarian male ice dancers
Olympic figure skaters of Russia
Figure skaters at the 2006 Winter Olympics
Figure skaters at the 2010 Winter Olympics
Living people
1982 births
Sportspeople from Samara, Russia
Olympic bronze medalists for Russia
Olympic medalists in figure skating
World Figure Skating Championships medalists
European Figure Skating Championships medalists
World Junior Figure Skating Championships medalists
Medalists at the 2010 Winter Olympics
Season-end world number one figure skaters